Francisco António Real (born 13 October 1885, date of death unknown) was a Portuguese sports shooter. He competed at the 1924, 1932 and the 1936 Summer Olympics.

References

External links
 

1885 births
Year of death missing
Portuguese male sport shooters
Olympic shooters of Portugal
Shooters at the 1924 Summer Olympics
Shooters at the 1932 Summer Olympics
Shooters at the 1936 Summer Olympics
Sportspeople from Lisbon